Laba Township is a township in Lancang Lahu Autonomous County, Yunnan, China.

Administrative division
As of 2016, the township is divided into six villages: 
Talanong
Mangdong
Xiaolaba
Nanpan
Yintong
Nanlie

History
After the founding of the Communist State in 1949, Ximeng District was set up. It was renamed "Laba District" in 1953. During the Great Leap Forward, its name was changed to "Laba Commune" in 1958 and then Xiangdong Commune in 1969. It was incorporated as a township in 1988.

Geography
The township is located in southwestern Lancang Lahu Autonomous County. It borders Zhutang Township in the north, Ximeng County and Menglian County in the west, Donghui Town in the south, and Menglang Town in the east.

There are mainly three rivers in the township, namely the Nanluo River, Nannong River and Nanpan River.

Economy
The township's economy is based on nearby mineral resources and agricultural resources. The region abounds with manganese, lead, zinc, and copper. The main crops of the region are grain, followed by corn and wheat. Economic crops are mainly tea and fruit.

Demographics

As of 2017, the National Bureau of Statistics of China estimates the township's population now to be 15,000.

Transportation
The Provincial Highway S320 winds through the township.

References

Bibliography

Townships of Pu'er City
Divisions of Lancang Lahu Autonomous County